Collagen is a protein that is an important part of connective tissues in the body. It is a rigid, non-soluble and fibrous protein that adds up to one third of the proteins found in the human body. Collagen is mostly made up of molecules that are packed together to form long and thin fibrils that support each other and ensure the skin is strong and elastic. There are various types of collagens which have individual roles and structures. Most collagen belongs to types 1, 2 and 3. Collagen consists mainly of amino acids and can be mostly found in tendons, muscles, bones, skin, ligaments and other fibrous tissues. It helps keep the skin strong and supple and sustains the renewal of skin cells and replacement of damaged and dead body cells. The collagen tissues support the formation of bones, tendons, and cartilage that form depending on the level of mineralization. However, an individual can lose collagen components in the body due to exposure to ultraviolet light, tobacco, excessive intake of sugar, and aging. This loss of collagen can cause the skin to lose elasticity, reduction of the thickness of the epidermis, increase in the formation of wrinkles and sagging, and also make the skin vulnerable and easily damaged.

Molecular mechanisms in Skin Aging 
There are many dissimilar models that have been used to explain skin aging on a molecular basis such as the theory of cellular senescence, the reduction in the cell's DNA repair capacity, and the loss of telomeres, oxidative stress, etc. Some scientists also proposed that a large portion of skin aging is caused by external factors while only 3% is caused by internal factors. In the following sections, we discuss prominent models and advancements in molecular mechanism studies related to skin aging.

Oxidative stress
Oxidative stress shows the lack of balance between the systemic appearance of the oxygen species that are reactive and the biological system's capability to detoxify the reactive elements or repairing the damage that results from the imbalance. It is known that reactive oxygen species (ROS) take part in a very crucial role in dermal changes taking place outside the cells in both aging caused by internal factors and those caused by external factors. ROS can be created from many dissimilar sources which include the mitochondrion, endoplasmic reticulum and peroxisomal. In normal conditions with the exception of ligands the various actions of receptor tyrosine kinases on the surface of the cell are repressed by the receptor protein tyrosine phosphatases.

DNA damage 
Exposure to ultraviolet rays may cause damage of the DNA, which may disrupt the function of genes that play a huge role in the skin stem cells homeostasis. By exposing the skin frequently to ultraviolet radiation, the damage of DNA increases and mutations also take place and may result to aging prematurely or carcinogenesis. In a scenario where the DNA take in photons emanating from UV-B the nucleotides arrangement structurally changes which leads to the DNA strands having defects. In the species that are lesser, they can be able to repair the damage on the DNA using the photolyase enzyme but higher species do not have this enzyme. Repair in the cells of humans can be attained by a nucleotide excision repair path, once the following proteins are deficient the skin is prone to premature aging.

Telomere shortening 
Telomeres are nucleoid sequences that repeat themselves and cap a chromosome. They protect the chromosomes from dilapidation and recombination abnormality. Their length decreases with every division of the cell and results in cellular senescence. They are critical body structures located at the end of the eukaryotic chromosomes which consists of many copies of G rich repeats. Without the presence of telomeres, the chromosomes will combine and cause instability in the genes. The enzyme that increases the telomere replications in order to prevent them from becoming short is known as telomerase. The deficiency of this enzyme can cause a hastened telomere shortening which could cause a flawed regeneration of the tissue. This also suppresses the production of epidermal cells. Also, the exposure to UV is known to cause mutation of the telomere and also cause the death of the cells.

Inflammaging 
This is the long-lasting inflammation that occurs as a result of aging. It affects the start and the progression of diseases that occur as a result of aging e.g., type 2 diabetes. It occurs in the skin because when exposed to the UV radiation it leads to the damaging of the epidermal cells which in turn cause inflammation to occur.

Collagen loss due to increase in age 
When an individual ages the outermost layer of skin becomes thin despite the number of layers of the cell remaining unchanged, and the number of cells that contain a pigment reduces and the melanocytes that remain increase in size. This is the reason why aging skin looks thin, pale and translucent. There may be large spots that are pigmented when some areas are exposed to sunlight. The various alterations in the connective tissue may decrease the strength of the skin and its elasticity. Also, the blood vessels in the outer skin become more delicate and can result to bruises and also bleeding under the surface of the skin. The subcutaneous glands also excrete low amounts of oil as you age. The men experience this shortage mostly after reaching the age of 80 years. The women may slowly begin excreting less oil after menopause thus is very hard to keep the skin moist. The layer of subcutaneous fat also decreases thus reducing the insulation and padding capability of the skin. This can make the individual be at risk of having an injury and also finds it very hard to maintain body temperature. The sweat glands also cut down on the amount of sweat they produce thus making the individual's body harder to cool.

Lifestyle habits that lead to collagen loss

Intake too much sugar 
The intake of too much sugar can lead to negative impacts to the body which include the damage of collagen. The excess consumption of sugar results to glycation that produces AGEs. This occurs naturally and when too much sugar is consumed the AGE molecules stick to the collagen molecules turning them stiff, thus damaging them. The process of glycation not only does it damage the collagen existing in the body but also makes some alterations to its stability. When an individual intakes large amounts of sugar the process of glycation converts the collagen into an unstable type 1 which is more vulnerable and can be easily broken down thus can lead to premature aging.

Tobacco Usage 
The use of tobacco can cause damage to the skin's collagen layer. It can cause the skin around the lips to lose collagen when in contact with the smoke or due to puckering of the lips around the cigarette, over time. It may also cause the vessels of blood to constrict and reduce blood flow. Due to this, perioral collagen (connective tissue around the mouth below the skin) may show signs of damage. When collagen is lost in large amounts, it may cause wrinkles to emerge. Tobacco use can also result in slow collagen healing.

Treatment for collagen loss 
There are various ways in which an individual is able to treat the loss of collagen. Dietary changes may increase the turnover of the cells and increase the creation of collagen. One can also adopt exercises that stimulate the production of collagen and also increase their intake of vitamin D. Also applying the necessary amounts of sunblock can prevent harmful amounts of UV-rays from the sun causing damage to your skin. You can also protect yourself from some of the causatives that breakdown collagen. Avoid spending too much time in the sun, apply sunblock, avoid smoking tobacco, drink plenty of water to prevent dehydration and participate in stress-relieving activities. Stress is known to cause skin aging.

In order to preserve healthy, young skin there are the various things that we have to put into consideration that help to ensure this goal is achieved. Taking vitamins C and A can provide a very good boost to the production of collagen in the body. In order to maintain healthy skin, you need to nurture and protect the collagen that is existing in the body by consuming healthy foods which have the necessary Vitamins, minerals and amino acids to promote collage productions and reduce cell damage in the body.

Approaches that can be used to counter collagen loss 
There are various ways which can be used to counter the loss of collagen from the body and may include the use of treatment using vitamin A etc. The skin can be subjected to either extrinsic or intrinsic factors caused by aging. Aging skin is identified by having wrinkles, losing skin flexibility, laxity and having a rough appearance in the skin texture. Cutaneous aging is mostly triggered by either the intrinsic and extrinsic factors. Intrinsic aging is an unavoidable process that occurs physiologically that causes the thinning of skin, wrinkling and also slow dermal atrophy. Correspondingly, extrinsic aging is triggered and influenced by external environmental factors which may include pollution in the air, smoking, having poor nutrition and having excess exposure to the sun. In the following research we will review the various changes that take place in the process of skin aging, the advancement of research in the molecular mechanisms that lead to the changes and also the various methods of treatment and skin maintenance.

Skin aging is not only affected by the intrinsic factors but also can be triggered and influenced by external factors. These changes occur simultaneously with the various phenotypic alterations in the cutaneous cells and also may change the structures and functions of extracellular constituents which may include collagens, proteoglycans and elastin that are necessary for providing the strength of stretching, elasticity and the hydration of the skin.

Intrinsic aging of the skin is a process of the skin changing over a period of time. Aging of the inner parts of the body that are protected mainly occur due to the intrinsic factors that can be genetic or metabolic, while the parts that are exposed are affected by the extrinsic influences, this consists mostly of ultraviolet rays from the sun. For the skin that has undergone intrinsic changes most of the variations are identifiable on the basal layer. Studies have shown that when the person becomes older the reproduction of the cells in the basal layer decreases. Thus the epidermis becomes thinner and the surface area of contact in between the dermis and epidermis reduces thus leads to a decrease in the nutrition exchange to the epidermis. This causes the basal layer to be weak thus the cells cannot multiply or grow. This process which involves a decrease in the productivity of cells is known as cellular senescence. Research shows that in skin that has aged intrinsically does not only degenerate collagens, elastin etc., but also oligosaccharide which affects the skin's ability to retain moisture.

Besides the internal factors that may cause skin aging, external factors such as being exposed to sunlight also causes the skin to age. 80% of the cases of skin aging have been caused by exposure to the ultraviolet radiation which is the primary cause of extrinsic aging of the skin. In contrast to the thinning of the epidermis in internally aged skin, the extrinsically aged skin the ultraviolet rays cause the epidermis to thicken, the outmost level of the epidermis which is the stratum corneum is affected and becomes thick due to the failure of the corneocyte desmosomes. In the basal cells the protein on the cell surface interacts with the proteins are largely decreased showing that the rate of production of the cells is also reduced. When exposed to the ultraviolet radiation, the type VII collagen in keratinocytes decreases which in turn leads to the emergence of wrinkles that come about due to weakening connection between the dermis and epidermis. Research shows that type 1 collagen reduces in amount when exposed to UV light because of the dilapidation of the collagen.

There are also MMPs and proteases that take place in the dilapidation activity. In a skin that has gone through photo aging, there is a noticeable feature that occurs deeply in the dermis which is the buildup of uncharacteristic elastic tissue, this is called solar elastolysis. The UV radiation causes the level of elastin which forms the fiber cleavage which in turn causes the deposit of elastic fibers. Research has shown that aging caused by exposure to UV causes the N-terminal and center parts of the tropoelastin molecules to be prone to enzymatic cleavage thus resulting to an acceleration of the dilapidation of elastin in relation to the age of the individual. Similarly, the microvasculature also reduces as the individual ages. This occurs as a result of the endothelial dysfunction which also comprises a reduction in angiogenic capacity and also having an impaired vasodilatory tasks.

References 

Aging-associated diseases